Albert Voorhies (January 23, 1829 – January 20, 1913) was the 10th Lieutenant Governor of Louisiana. He was Lieutenant Governor under James Madison Wells from March 4, 1865 – June 3, 1867. He was a pro-slavery Southern Democrat and often at odds with the pro-suffrage, anti-slavery, Radical Republican Wells. He also found a career in justice and worked his way up to the Louisiana Supreme Court, where he succeeded his father, Cornelius Voorhies, and  served from April 1859 to April 1865. He died January 20, 1913, in Lafayette Parish, Louisiana at the age of 83 years and 362 days.

Personal life
Voorhies was born in St. Martinville, Louisiana, to Cornelius and Marie Cidalise Voorhies. He married Marie Leotand Durand and with her had 6 children.

References

1829 births
1913 deaths
Louisiana Democrats
Justices of the Louisiana Supreme Court
Lieutenant Governors of Louisiana
19th-century American judges